Penny Century may refer to:

 Penny Century, a character in (and book title of) the comics Love and Rockets
 Penny Century, a 1988 EP by The Cassandra Complex
 Penny Century (The Clouds album), 1991
 Penny Century (The Bear Quartet album), 1992